Aleksandar Denić (born 31 October 1963, in Belgrade) (outside Serbia frequently spelt Aleksandar Denic) is a Serbian stage designer and film production designer. He is known as a scenographer of feature films, as well as for his work at major theatres including Berlin, Hamburg, Stuttgart, Bayreuth, Paris, Zurich, Wien, Salzburg, Köln and Munich.

Life 
Denić graduated from the Academy of Applied Arts of the University of the Arts in Belgrade in film and set design. He worked after graduation mainly as a production designer for film projects, including the film Underground by Emir Kusturica. He was also production designer for over 100 television commercials, for clients including Renault, SAS and Lucky Strike.

In 2011 he met with the German theatre director Frank Castorf, who came to Belgrade for a cooperation project. For his stage set at Castorf's production of  Louis-Ferdinand Céline's Journey to the End of the Night in 2013 at the Munich Residenztheater he won the 2014 theatre critics' poll of Theater heute magazine  as "Set designer of the year."

In the year 2013 he worked with Castorf in staging Richard Wagner's Ring Cycle at the Bayreuth Festival.

In 2015, Denić worked at the Deutsches Schauspielhaus Hamburg, and also at the Residenz Theatre, Munich.

Awards
1996: Nominee Primetime Emmy Awards Outstanding Art Direction for a Miniseries or a Special "Rasputin"
2014: Nominated for Best Designer at International Opera Awards
2014: "Set designer of the year" (Theater heute magazine) for Journey to the End of Night,  Residenztheater, Munich
2014: Der Faust in the category "Staging and costume".
2014: "Stage designer of the year" (Opernwelt magazine) for Der Ring des Nibelungen, Bayreuth Festival
2015: "Set designer of the year"  (Theater heute magazine)  for Baal, Residenztheater, Munich
2020: Nominated for Best Designer at International Opera Awards

Filmography 

 1995: Underground
 1996: Rasputin: Dark Servant of Destiny
 2001: Boomerang
 2001: Super 8 Stories
 2002: Deathwatch
 2004: Falling into Paradise
 2006: Guca!
 2008: 
 2009: Zone of the Dead
 2012: Cat Run
 2012: Chernobyl Diaries
 2014: Travelator

External links 
 
 Aleksandar Denić dedicated website

Notes 

1963 births
Theatre people from Belgrade
Set designers
Theatre designers
Living people
Opera designers
Film people from Belgrade